The Lizard Lounge is a nightclub situated in between Harvard Square and Porter Square on Massachusetts Avenue in Cambridge, Massachusetts.  It is below the restaurant Cambridge Common.  It may be a small basement bar, but it is known for the musicians it hosts.  The owners also own Cambridge Common and Toad – another live music venue. They carry a large selection of beers, including many local ones such as those made at Cambridge Brewing Company.

The Lizard Lounge is known for showcasing rock, blues, and jazz.  It hosts two well known bands year round, Session Americana and Club D'Elf, both of which are known to have multiple guests sit in with them and jam.  There is an open mic on Monday nights and a poetry slam on Sunday nights.  There are many loyal fans to this nightclub and its intimate setting for live music.  The bar has been open since 1996.

References

External links
Lizard Lounge's web page
Boston Magazine article
jambase.com

Buildings and structures in Cambridge, Massachusetts
Music venues in Massachusetts
Nightclubs in Massachusetts